Sunil Manchanda is an Indian film director, and producer, and an advertisement producer.

Career
His 2003 film Tere Naam won four awards. Manchanda also produced Cheeni Kum in 2007, which won one award and was nominated for four others. On 4 December 2009, Paa was released in 34 countries worldwide. It was originally supposed to be produced by Manchanda and Director R Balakrishnan, but was instead changed to Manchanda and AB Corporation.

In 2017, Manchanda was one of the producers behind the movie Mom.

Films

His most notable films include:

Awards, nominations
Paa received 14 Nominations for 16th Star Screen Awards 
and won 5 awards at the Screen Awards
Cheeni Kum received 1 award and 4 nominations, including the Apsara Award for Best Movie (2008)
Tere Naam received 4 awards and 16 nominations

References

External links
 
 Lord Owen's Lady - Official Facebook Site
 

Hindi film producers
Hindi-language film directors
Living people
Year of birth missing (living people)